George W. Jackson (born January 1, 1953) is an American real estate developer. From 2002 to 2014, he served as President and CEO of the Detroit Economic Growth Corp (DEGC), a non-profit organization which offers, financial, technical, and development assistance in Michigan.

Early life and education
Jackson was born in 1952 in Detroit, Michigan and graduated from Cooley High School. He went on to earn a bachelor's degree in human resource development from Oakland University and a master's degree in business management from Central Michigan University.

Jackson worked in personnel and human resources with the U.S. Navy and has been on the faculty of Lawrence Technological University.

Career
Jackson worked at DTE Energy for 27 years. He began his career with DTE as a personnel analyst and left as Director of Marketing and Economic Development. During his tenure, DTE's Energy Economic Development Department gained national recognition and received Site Selection Magazine's Utility Economic Development Award.

Detroit Economic Growth Corporation (DEGC) 

In February 2002, Jackson began his career at the DEGC as the Interim President and was elected President & CEO in April, 2002. Under Mayor Kwame Kilpatrick and Mayor Dave Bing, Jackson played a lead role in negotiating, planning and implementing virtually all of the Detroit's major economic development deals

During his tenure at the DEGC, Jackson also served as the professional & administrative staff for the Downtown Development Authority (DDA), Detroit Brownfield Redevelopment Authority (DBRA), Economic Development Corporation (EDC), Neighborhood Development Corporation (NDC), Local Development Finance Authority (LDFA), and Tax Increment Finance Authority (TIFA). From 2006 to 2010, Jackson was named Chief Development Officer for the City of Detroit. Jackson is the past chairman and a current board member of the NextEnergy Corp.; chairman of the board of the Eastern Market Corporation; chairman for the Greater Detroit Foreign Trade Zone; on the executive committee of the Downtown Partnership; and is the steering committee chair of Detroit Future City.

 Formation of industrial parks, such as the 186-acre I-94 Industrial Park, which employs thousands of workers. Linc Logistics' 500,000-square-foot facility was the first new tenant there, after Michigan made the industrial park a tax-free zone to help attract companies and jobs. The completion of auto parts supplier Flex-N-Gate's 350,000-square-foot plant is expected to add an additional 750 jobs to the Industrial Park. ArcelorMittal plans to move into a 317,000-square-foot building in the Industrial Park, to make steel blanks for the automotive industry.
 Administration of the Lower Woodward Improvement Program in preparation for Super Bowl XL in 2006. The program improved streetscapes on Woodward, Washington Blvd. and Broadway, as well as offered grants to building owners to assist in improving their facades.
 Demolition of the 175-foot Cemex-Medusa cement silo, the 125-foot Lafarge silo and 175-foot Holnam Detroit River silo on the Detroit riverfront. Demolition of the three silos paved the way for a host of new riverfront projects, including the expansion of Tri-Centennial State Park and Harbor; and Detroit's RiverWalk, a five-mile-long promenade that spans from the Ambassador Bridge eastward to beyond MacArthur Bridge and into Gabriel Richard Park.
 Oversight of the $190 million redevelopment of the long-shuttered Book Cadillac Hotel, as the Westin Book Cadillac Hotel.
 Offered incentives to Dan Gilbert, to relocate the Quicken Loans headquarters from the suburbs to downtown Detroit. Since moving Downtown in 2010, Quicken and its affiliated companies, have created more than 13,000 jobs and invested $2.2 billion in the city. The investment includes renovating over 90 buildings in the urban core, helping to fuel the most rapid downtown transformation in modern history.
 Oversight of the $279 million renovation and 40,000-square-foot expansion of the Cobo Center, which included new ballroom space, the creation of a three-story atrium facing the Detroit River, and a wall-sized digital screen that shows images on the redesigned east exterior side of the building. The upgrades were requested by the North American International Auto Show, to guarantee a stronger and longer commitment to keep them at the Cobo location.
 Spurred private investment in the rapid development of the Midtown area of the Detroit.
 Led Detroit negotiations with the Ilitch family over financial obligations at the city-owned Joe Louis Arena, such as rent and cable TV revenues.
 Led the $41 million redevelopment of Capitol Park, including redevelopment of the Capitol Park Building, the former United Way Headquarters and the Farwell Building, all located on Griswold.
 Led development efforts for Orleans Landing, a $65-million project on Detroit's East Riverfront. The development will include 278 apartments, of which approximately 20% will be held for "affordable income" residents. It will also include 10,000 square feet of retail space and various other amenities.
 Began clean-up of the long-vacant Uniroyal side near the MacArthur Bridge to Belle Isle, in preparation for a multimillion-dollar mixed-use project.
 Brokered a deal between the DDA and the Ilitch family, owners of the Detroit Red Wings, to facilitate The District Detroit, Detroit's largest residential development in over twenty years. The three year development created five new neighborhoods, transforming a largely vacant and blighted area. Replacing it are a $450 million, 650,000 square foot hockey arena and events center and $200 million in apartments, restaurants, office buildings, parks and shops over 45 blocks Planned projects in the development district include the Wayne State University Mike Ilitch School of Business, a 120,000-square-foot building that will house business school students.
 Developed six barren acres into 500 "mini- farms."
 Oversight of Gateway Marketplace Shopping Center. The shopping center, located at Eight Mile Rd. and Woodward, was the largest retail development in Detroit in four decades. The shopping complex is anchored by a 197,000 square foot Meijer and generates approximately $10.75 million in new taxes, due to the property's increased value. Another Meijer is slated to be built on the former west side site of the Redford High School.

Post-DEGC work
After his retirement, Jackson began his own real estate consulting firm, Ventra Group, where he currently acts as President & CEO.

Since retiring from the DEGC, Jackson has worked as a development consultant for residential projects in District Detroit 
and is developing a vacant Eastern Market property, located at 3500 Riopelle Street. The development will exists as a new food business hub and will contain a brewery, restaurants, and retail as well as food processing, preservation, storage, and production facilities.

Personal life
Jackson is the single father of three sons.

Awards and accolades
Jackson has won several awards for his work in the Detroit area. In 2006, the city magazine Hour Detroit named Jackson "Detroiter of the Year". In 2007, Oakland County's economic initiative Automation Alley awarded him the "CEO of the Year".  In 2009, the Friends School in Detroit gave him a "Revitalization of the City Award". In 2016, the publishing company Crain's Detroit Business listed him in its "50 Names to Know: Real Estate" article.

References 

Living people
1952 births
Businesspeople from Detroit
Oakland University alumni
Central Michigan University alumni
20th-century American businesspeople
20th-century African-American people
21st-century American businesspeople
African-American business executives
American business executives
21st-century African-American people